State Road 65 (NM 65) is a state highway in the US state of New Mexico. NM 65's northern terminus is a continuation as County Road 263 (CR 263) at the intersection of Forest 156 Road, and the southern terminus is at NM 329 in Las Vegas.

Major intersections

See also

References

065
Transportation in San Miguel County, New Mexico
Las Vegas, New Mexico